The 2014 Challenger Banque Nationale de Rimouski was a professional tennis tournament played on indoor hard courts. It was the 8th edition of the tournament and part of the 2014 ATP Challenger Tour, offering a total of $40,000 in prize money. It took place in Rimouski, Canada between March 17 and March 23, 2014.

Singles main-draw entrants

Seeds

1 Rankings are as of March 10, 2014

Other entrants
The following players received wildcards into the singles main draw:
 Hugo Di Feo
 Richard Gabb
 Isade Juneau
 Pavel Krainik

The following players entered the singles main draw with a protected ranking:
 Giovanni Lapentti
 Izak van der Merwe

The following players received entry from the qualifying draw:
 Kevin King
 Nikita Kryvonos
 Adrien Bossel
 Dennis Nevolo

Champions

Singles

 Sam Groth def.  Ante Pavić, 7–6(7–3), 6–2

Doubles

 Edward Corrie /  Daniel Smethurst def.  Germain Gigounon /  Olivier Rochus, 6–2, 6–1

External links
Official website

Challenger Banque Nationale de Drummondville
Challenger de Drummondville
Challenger Banque Nationale de Drummondville
Challenger Banque Nationale de Rimouski
Challenger Banque Nationale de Drummondville